is a train station in the city of Ena, Gifu Prefecture, Japan, operated by the Third-sector railway operator Akechi Railway.

Lines

Station layout
Iibama Station has one side platform serving a single bi-directional track. The station is unattended.

Adjacent stations

|-
!colspan=5|Akechi Railway

History
Iibama Station opened on January 10, 1959.

Surrounding area

See also
 List of Railway Stations in Japan

References

External links

 

Railway stations in Gifu Prefecture
Railway stations in Japan opened in 1959
Stations of Akechi Railway
Ena, Gifu